Little Chief Mountain is located in the Lewis Range, Glacier National Park in the U.S. state of Montana. Little Chief Mountain is easily seen from the Going-to-the-Sun Road, rising to the south of Saint Mary Lake.  Little Chief Mountain was named in 1887 by George Bird Grinnell for his friend, Frank North, U.S. Army. "Little Chief" was his Pawnee name, given to him by his Pawnee Scouts.

Climate

Based on the Köppen climate classification, Little Chief Mountain is located in a subarctic climate zone characterized by long, usually very cold winters, and short, cool to mild summers. Winter temperatures can drop below −10 °F with wind chill factors below −30 °F.

Geology
Like other mountains in Glacier National Park, Little Chief Mountain is composed of sedimentary rock laid down during the Precambrian to Jurassic periods.

Gallery

See also
 List of mountains and mountain ranges of Glacier National Park (U.S.)
 Geology of the Rocky Mountains

References

External links
 National Park Service web site: Glacier National Park
 Little Chief Mountain weather: Mountain Forecast

Little Chief Mountain
Mountains of Glacier National Park (U.S.)
Lewis Range
Mountains of Montana